The Arenatus barb (Puntius arenatus) is a species of ray-finned fish in the genus Puntius from India.

References 

arenatus
Taxa named by Francis Day
Fish described in 1878
Barbs (fish)